Kellen Boswell Winslow Sr. (born November 5, 1957) is an American former professional football player in the National Football League (NFL). A member of the Pro Football Hall of Fame (1995), he is widely recognized as one of the greatest tight ends in the league's history. Winslow played his entire NFL career from 1979 to 1987 with the San Diego Chargers after being selected in the first round of the 1979 NFL Draft. He played college football for the University of Missouri, where he was a consensus All-American. He was also inducted into the College Football Hall of Fame (2002).

Winslow is the former director of athletics at Florida A&M University. He has previously held administrative roles at Central State University where he was athletic director and vice president for athletics and wellness at Lakeland College.

Early years
Winslow attended East St. Louis Senior High School and did not play high school football until his senior year. Until then, he was a self-described "nerd" who played chess.  In college, Winslow played for the Missouri Tigers, and was a two-time all-conference selection in the Big Eight and a consensus All-American in 1978. He led the Big Eight in touchdown receptions in both 1977 and 1978, catching three and six respectively. He finished his college career with 71 receptions for 1,089 yards and 10 touchdowns.

Professional career
Winslow was drafted in the first round of the 1979 NFL Draft by the Chargers, with the #13 pick. Winslow played for them his entire career, when he retired in 1987 due to injury. After a knee injury prematurely ended his rookie season, Winslow, as part of Air Coryell, led the NFL in receptions in 1980 and 1981, becoming the second tight end ever to lead the league in receptions in back to back seasons. His 89 catches in 1980 was an NFL record for tight ends, breaking the previous mark of 75 held by Mike Ditka. He also exceeded the 1,000 yards receiving milestone in 3 seasons, including setting an NFL single season record for receiving yards by a tight end with 1,290 yards in the 1980 season. The record stood until Rob Gronkowski totaled 1,327 yards in 2011. In a 1981 regular season game, Winslow tied an NFL record by catching five touchdown passes.

In a 1981–82 playoff game against the Miami Dolphins that became known as The Epic in Miami, Winslow caught a playoff record 13 passes for 166 yards and a touchdown, while also blocking a field goal with seconds remaining to send the game to overtime in one of the greatest single player efforts in NFL history. Winslow's yardage total stood as the playoff record for tight ends for 30 years until Vernon Davis's 180 yards in 2012. What made Winslow's performance all the more memorable was that fact during the game he was treated for a pinched nerve in his shoulder, dehydration, severe cramps, and received three stitches in his lower lip. After the game, a picture of Winslow being helped off the field by his teammates became an enduring image in NFL lore.

Tight ends prior to Winslow were primarily blockers lined up next to an offensive lineman and ran short to medium drag routes. Winslow was put in motion so he would not be jammed at the line, or he was lined up wide or in the slot against a smaller cornerback. Former Chargers assistant coach Al Saunders said Winslow was "a wide receiver in an offensive lineman's body." Chargers head coach Don Coryell said, "If we're asking Kellen to block a defensive end and not catch passes, I'm not a very good coach." Back then, defenses would cover Winslow with a strong safety or a linebacker, as zone defenses were not as popular. Strong safeties in those times were almost like another linebacker, a run defender who could not cover a tight end as fast as Winslow. Providing another defender to help the strong safety opened up other holes. Former head coach Jon Gruden called Winslow the first "joker" in the NFL. He would line up unpredictably in any formation from a three point blocking stance to a two point receiver's stance, to being in motion like a flanker or an offensive back. Head coach Bill Belichick notes that the pass-catching tight ends who get paid the most money are "all direct descendants of Kellen Winslow" and that there are fewer tight ends now who can block on the line.

Winslow was off of to a record setting receiving pace in 1984 in term of receptions, accumulating 55 catches in only seven games. On October 21, 1984, in the Chargers's seventh game of season against the Los Angeles Raiders, having already caught 8 passes for 107 yards, Winslow suffered a severe right knee injury while making his 55th reception of the season. Winslow knee twisted while being tacked by Raiders linebacker Jeff Barnes.  Dr. Gary Losse, who performed surgery on Winslow's knee for over two hours, later said that Winslow's knee looked like "spaghetti....like a couple of mop ends". Dr. Losse also said "The ligaments had almost an explosion-like appearance, it was a very, very severe knee injury." Winslow came back in the middle of the 1985 season, but was never again close to being the dominant player he had been. He retired after the 1987 season.

Winslow played in five Pro Bowls, was elected to the Pro Football Hall of Fame in 1995, and the College Football Hall of Fame in 2002. In his nine NFL seasons, Winslow caught 541 passes for 6,741 yards and 45 touchdowns. Kellen was a consensus All-Pro in 1980, 1981, and 1982. He is also a member of the NFL's 75th Anniversary All-Time Team. He was the San Diego Chargers' honorary captain at Super Bowl XXIX, and one of seven participants in the game's pregame coin toss, joining fellow 75th Anniversary Team members Otto Graham, Mean Joe Greene, Ray Nitschke, and Gale Sayers, as well as fellow PFHOF Class of 1995 members Steve Largent, then a U.S. Congressman, and Lee Roy Selmon.  Winslow worked as a college football announcer with Fox Sports Net. In 2008, he was appointed the athletic director of Central State University in Ohio.

In 1999, he was ranked number 73 on The Sporting News' list of the 100 greatest football players of all time.

Personal life
Winslow is the father of Justin Winslow and Kellen Winslow II, who also played tight end in the NFL. Kellen II was drafted in the first round of the 2004 NFL Draft by the Cleveland Browns, the team the Chargers traded with to draft the elder Winslow in 1979. On October 17, 2006, Justin died, although no cause of death was reported; he was 23 years of age and was found unconscious by his mother.
Kellen Winslow II was convicted of multiple rape and sexual assault charges against five women. Winslow II was sentenced to 14 years in prison on March 3, 2021.

References

External links

 
 
 

1957 births
Living people
African-American college athletic directors in the United States
African-American players of American football
All-American college football players
American Conference Pro Bowl players
American football tight ends
Central State Marauders athletic directors
College Football Hall of Fame inductees
Florida A&M Rattlers and Lady Rattlers athletic directors
Lakeland Muskies athletic directors
Missouri Tigers football players
People from St. Clair County, Illinois
Players of American football from Illinois
Pro Football Hall of Fame inductees
San Diego Chargers players
Players of American football from St. Louis
21st-century African-American people
20th-century African-American sportspeople